I Am with You (Swedish: Jag är med eder...) is a 1948 Swedish drama film directed by Gösta Stevens and starring Victor Sjöström, Rune Lindström and Nils Dahlgren. It was shot at the Råsunda Studios in Stockholm. The film's sets were designed by the art director Nils Svenwall. Location shooting took place around Victoria Falls and the Mberengwa District. It received backing from the Church of Sweden and was picked up for American distribution the following year.

Synopsis
Helge Tellberg leaves Sweden with his wife and young son to become a missionary in Southern Rhodesia.

Cast
 Victor Sjöström as 	Vicar
 Rune Lindström as 	Helge Tellberg
 Carin Cederström as 	Carin
 Lars Lindström as 	Lasse
 Nils Dahlgren as 	Henrik Ljung
 Carl Ström as 	Bishop
 Åke Fridell as 	Carlsson
 Signe Lundberg-Settergren as 	Maria
 Erik Forslund as 	Old Man
 Lena Mbuisa as 	Estina, wife of Esau
 Pedro Tapareza as Esau

References

Bibliography 
 Pensel, Hans. Seastrom and Stiller in Hollywood: Two Swedish Directors in Silent American Films 1921-1930. Vantage Press, 1969.
 Suit, Kenneth. James Friedrich and Cathedral Films: The Independent Religious Cinema of the Evangelist of Hollywood, 1939-1966. Lexington Books, 2017.

External links 
 

1948 films
Swedish drama films
1948 drama films
1940s Swedish-language films
Films directed by Gösta Stevens
Films set in Zimbabwe
Films shot in Zimbabwe
1940s Swedish films